Albert School may refer to schools, or former schools, in multiple nations:

 Albert Academy, Freetown, Sierra Leone
Albert Community Centre, Saskatoon, Saskatchewan, Canada, originally named Albert School
Greater St. Albert Catholic Schools, Alberta, Canada
Mount Albert Grammar School, Central Auckland, New Zealand
 The Royal Alexandra and Albert School, Reigate, Surrey, England
Saint Alberts High School, Zimbabwe
Saint Albert High School, Council Bluffs, Iowa
 St. Albert the Great Elementary School, Louisville, Kentucky
Williams Creek School, Gillespie County, Texas, US, originally named Albert School